Sedenhorstia is an extinct genus of prehistoric bony fish that lived from the Cenomanian to Campanian.

See also

 Prehistoric fish
 List of prehistoric bony fish

References

Late Cretaceous fish
Elopiformes
Late Cretaceous fish of Asia